Neyestan (also Romanized as Neyestān) is a village in Bizaki Rural District, Golbajar District, Chenaran County, Razavi Khorasan Province, Iran. At the 2006 census, its population was 80, in 25 families.

References 

Populated places in Chenaran County